= Palacio de los Condes del Vado y de Guenduláin =

Coordinates: 42.81661°N 1.64530°W

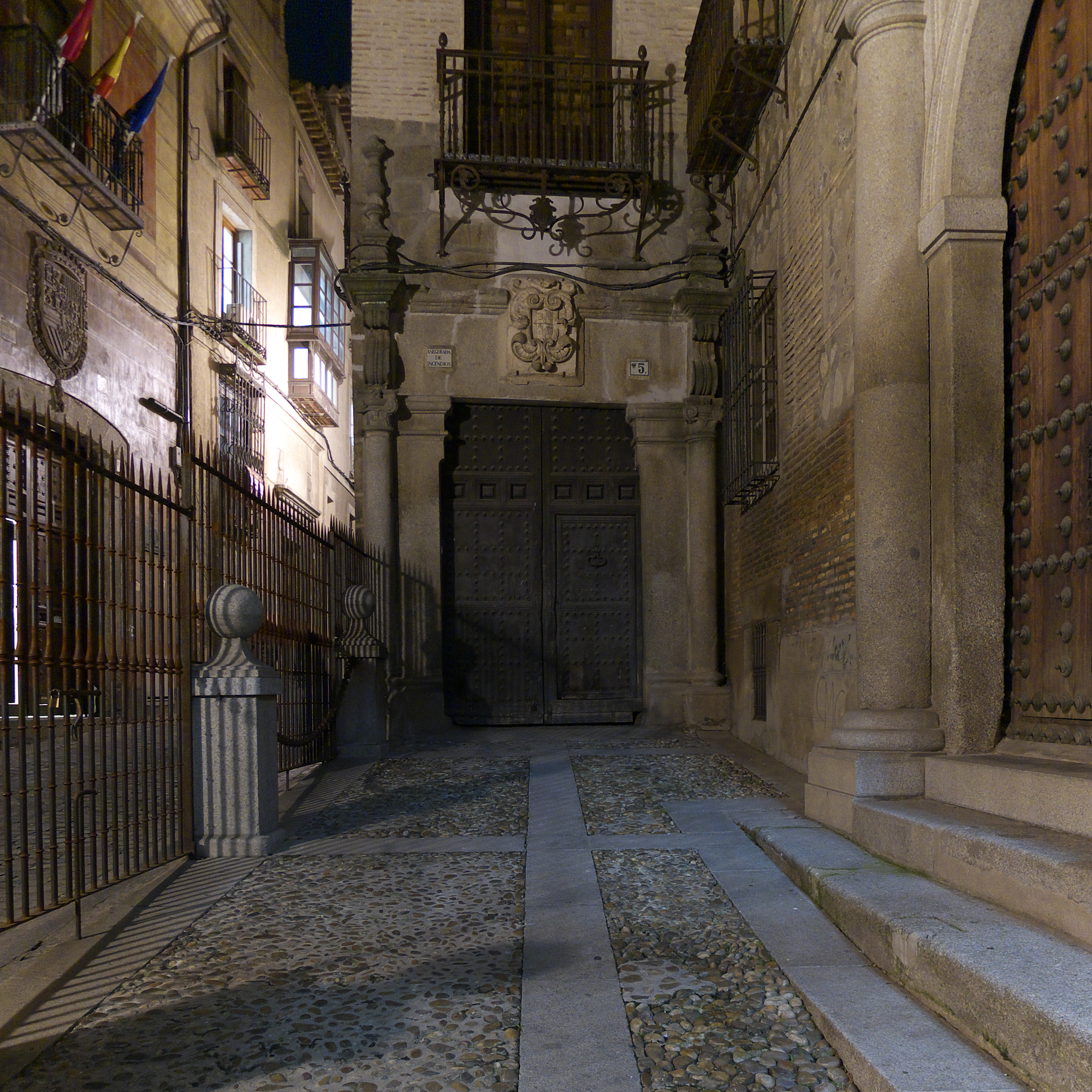
Palacio de los Condes del Vado y de Guenduláin

The Palacio de los Condes del Vado y de Guenduláin is a palace located in the city of Toledo, in Castile-La Mancha, Spain.
